Vesyoly is a rural locality (a khutor) in Mikhaylovka Urban Okrug, Volgograd Oblast, Russia. The population was 147 as of 2010. There are 3 streets.

Geography 
Vesyoly is located 60 km northeast of Mikhaylovka. 2-y Plotnikov is the nearest rural locality.

References 

Rural localities in Mikhaylovka urban okrug